Steffen Brand (born 10 March 1965, in Recklinghausen) is a retired German runner who specialized in the 3000 metres steeplechase.

His personal best time is 8:14.37 minutes, achieved at the 1995 World Championships in Gothenburg. This result places him seventh on the German all-time performers list, behind Damian Kallabis, Hagen Melzer, Frank Baumgartl, Rainer Schwarz, Uwe Pflügner and Michael Karst.

He competed for the sports clubs TV Wattenscheid 01 (1985–1993) and LG Bayer Leverkusen (1994-) during his active career.

Achievements

References

1965 births
Living people
German male middle-distance runners
German male steeplechase runners
Athletes (track and field) at the 1992 Summer Olympics
Athletes (track and field) at the 1996 Summer Olympics
Olympic athletes of Germany
People from Recklinghausen
Sportspeople from Münster (region)
20th-century German people
21st-century German people